is a Japanese football player. She plays for Urawa Reds. She played for Japan national team.

Club career
Ueno was born in Matsudo on November 20, 1994. In 2013, she joined JEF United Chiba from Urawa Reds youth team. She was selected Best Young Player awards in 2013 season.

National team career
On September 26, 2013, when Ueno was 18 years old, she debuted for Japan national team against Nigeria.

National team statistics

References

External links
JEF United Chiba

1994 births
Living people
Shukutoku University alumni
Association football people from Chiba Prefecture
Japanese women's footballers
Japan women's international footballers
Nadeshiko League players
JEF United Chiba Ladies players
Women's association football defenders